The 1937 Maine Black Bears football team was an American football team that represented the University of Maine as a member of the New England Conference during the 1937 college football season. In its 17th season under head coach Fred Brice, the team compiled a 2–3–2 record (0–1–1 against conference opponents). The team played its home games at Alumni Field in Orono, Maine. Ernest Reidman was the team captain.

Schedule

References

Maine
Maine Black Bears football seasons
Maine Black Bears football